Miševići is a Serbo-Croatian toponym that may refer to:

Miševići, Hadžići, in Bosnia and Herzegovina
Miševići (Nova Varoš), in Serbia